Hotel 101 Resorts-Boracay is a proposed 1,001-room hotel in Boracay in Malay, Aklan, Philippines. If built it will be the largest hotel in the Philippines in terms of room count.

Background
On February 1, 2018, DoubleDragon Properties announced that it would build its fourth hotel under its Hotel 101 brand, named Hotel 101 Resorts-Boracay. It will a joint venture between DoubleDragon subsidiary Hotel of Asia Inc. and partner Newcoast South Beach Inc. The proposed hotel with 1,001 rooms is envisioned to be the biggest in the country in terms of room count. It will be built at the  Boracay Newcoast development of Megaworld subsidiary Global-Estate Resorts, Inc.

The hotel will be equipped with a rainwater harvesting system and is expected to be a LEED (Leadership in Energy and Environment Design) certified development. The developers are aiming to secure a LEED certification for the hotel, which is planned to have a rainwater harvesting system and be partially powered by solar panels. In November 2019, it was announced that Barone International was tapped as consultant to help secure LEED certification for the hotel.

Despite plans of the Philippine government to close Boracay for redevelopment, it was announce in March 2018 that plans for the hotel was unaffected which was then still in the planning stages. Boracay was closed by the government from April to October 2018.

References

Hotels in the Philippines
Buildings and structures in Aklan
Proposed hotels
Proposed buildings and structures in the Philippines
Boracay